The 1957 World Table Tennis Championships men's doubles was the 24th edition of the men's doubles championship.
Ivan Andreadis and Ladislav Štípek won the title after defeating Ichiro Ogimura and Toshiaki Tanaka in the final by three sets to one.

Results

See also
 List of World Table Tennis Championships medalists

References

-